Timberhouse is a historic plantation house located at Newberry, Newberry County, South Carolina.  It was built about 1858 by Jacob Kibler, and is a two-story, weatherboarded Greek Revival style dwelling.  It features double-tiered full-width porches supported by six square wood pillars and exterior end chimneys.

It was listed on the National Register of Historic Places in 1980.

Kibler, who built the residence, owned 68 slaves in 1850, eight years before Timberhouse was constructed.

References 

Plantation houses in South Carolina
Houses on the National Register of Historic Places in South Carolina
Greek Revival houses in South Carolina
Houses completed in 1858
Houses in Newberry County, South Carolina
National Register of Historic Places in Newberry County, South Carolina
Newberry, South Carolina